Access Authentication in CDMA networks for telecommunications and computing provide network access for a mobile device. Specific methods such as CAVE-based Authentication (IS-95/1xRTT), and A12 Authentication (1xEV-DO) are possible. The serving network provides the mobile device access authentication mechanism.

The exact method employed depends upon the type of service being used:
CAVE-based Authentication – Used for access authentication in CDMA/1xRTT
AKA – 3G successor to CAVE-based authentication
A12 Authentication – Used for access authentication in 1xEV-DO

Note that 1xEV-DO Hybrid MS/AT devices may employ both CAVE-based and A12 authentication since these devices connect to both the 1xRTT and 1xEV-DO networks.

See also
Channel access method
List of authentication protocols
List of CDMA2000 networks
Mobile broadband

References

Code division multiple access